Umayya ibn ʿAbd Shams  was the son of Abd Shams and is said to be the progenitor of the line of the Umayyad Caliphs. The clan of Banu Umayya as well as the dynasty that ruled the Umayyad Caliphate and Caliphate of Córdoba are named after Umayya ibn Abd Shams.

This position was likely an occasional political post whose holder oversaw the direction of Mecca's military affairs in times of war instead of an actual field command. This proved instructive as later Umayyads were known for possessing considerable political and military organizational skills.

His children were:
 Abu al-'As
 Harb
 Al-'As
 Abu 'Amr
 Abu al-'Is
 Safiyya

References

https://archive.org/details/nasqurPDF

6th-century Arabs
 
Family of Muhammad
People from Mecca
Tribes of Arabia
Banu Abd Shams
515 births